The 2007–08 A1 Grand Prix of Nations, Netherlands was an A1 Grand Prix race, held on September 30, 2007 at the Circuit Park Zandvoort in Zandvoort, Netherlands. This was the first in the 2007-08 A1 Grand Prix season.

The sprint race was won by A1 Team South Africa, while the Great Britain car won the Feature Race. With South Africa getting second place in the Feature Race, they took the early lead in the championship.

Pre-race 
Due to Zandvoort's noise restriction, Netherlands round wasn't able to  conduct Friday sessions and so rookie session. Saturday morning was dedicated to practice sessions and Saturday afternoon to qualify sessions for each Sunday race.

Qualifications

Sprint Race 
The Sprint Race took place on Sunday, September 30, 2007

Main Race 
The Main Race took place also on Sunday, September 30, 2007.

Mexico won the Feature race fastest lap point with a lap time of 1'29.181 therefore giving them an extra point on top of their 4th-place finish points.

Notes 
 It was the 23rd race weekend (46 starts)
 It was the 2nd race in the Circuit Park Zandvoort and the 2nd in Netherlands.
 It was the first race for Chris Alajajian, Satrio Hermanto, Erik Janiš, Sérgio Jimenez and Buddy Rice.
 It was the first race weekend for Chris Alajajian, Satrio Hermanto, Erik Janiš, Sérgio Jimenez and Buddy Rice.
 Records:
 South Africa take 5 poles position.
 A1 Team Lebanon participate on 23 races (46 starts) without won points since their first Grand Prix.
 Alex Yoong participate on 22 races (42 starts).
 Neel Jani won 156 points.
 Erik Janiš became the 100th A1GP race driver.

References

External links 
 Sprint race results
 Main race results

A1 Grand Prix Of Nations, Netherlands, 2007-08
A1 Grand Prix Of Nations, Netherlands, 2007-08